The Portland Hills fault zone is the largest shallow fault that cuts beneath Portland, Oregon. It stretches from Oregon City to Scappoose, and has a zone of deformation that extends at least .

References

Seismic faults of Oregon